The National Football League Management Council is a non-profit association of clubs in the National Football League (NFL) that represents its members in negotiations related to the  Collective Bargaining Agreement with the NFL Players Association.  It is based in New York City and its chairman is the NFL Executive Vice President of Labor Relations, Harold Henderson.

References

Management Council
Sports labor disputes in the United States